1995 Urawa Red Diamonds season

Review and events

League results summary

League results by round

Competitions

Domestic results

J.League

Emperor's Cup

Player statistics

 † player(s) joined the team after the opening of this season.

Transfers

In:

Out:

Transfers during the season

In
 Kwak Kyung-Keun (from Fukuoka Blux on May)
 Toninho (loan from Shimizu S-Pulse on August)

Out
 Satoru Mochizuki (to Kyoto Purple Sanga on June)
 Kiyonobu Okajima (to Tokyo Gas on July)
 Yoshiaki Satō (to Kyoto Purple Sanga on July)
 Kwak Kyung-Keun (to Fukushima FC on July)

Awards
J.League Top Scorer:  Masahiro Fukuda
J.League Best XI:  Guido Buchwald,  Masahiro Fukuda

Notes

References

Other pages
 J. League official site
 Urawa Red Diamonds official site

Urawa Red Diamonds
Urawa Red Diamonds seasons